Meadowdale is a census-designated place (CDP) located in Snohomish County, Washington. In 2010, it had a population of 2,826.  It was the first incorporated city in Snohomish County 

A post office called Meadowdale was established in 1904, and remained in operation until 1938. The community was named for a meadow near the original town site.

Geography
Meadowdale is located at coordinates 47°51'30"N 122°18'58"W. The land area is 1.07 sq. miles.

References

Census-designated places in Snohomish County, Washington